The 67th British Academy Film Awards, more commonly known as the BAFTAs, were held on 16 February 2014 at the Royal Opera House in London, honouring the best national and foreign films of 2013. The nominations were announced on 8 January 2014 by actor Luke Evans and actress Helen McCrory. Presented by the British Academy of Film and Television Arts, accolades were handed out for the best feature-length film and documentaries of any nationality that were screened at British cinemas in 2013.

Gravity won six of its eleven nominations, including Best Director for Alfonso Cuarón, Outstanding British Film, Best Cinematography, Best Original Music, Best Sound, and Best Special Visual Effects. 12 Years a Slave won Best Film and Best Actor in a Leading Role for Chiwetel Ejiofor. Cate Blanchett won Best Actress in a Leading Role for Blue Jasmine, Barkhad Abdi won Best Actor in a Supporting Role for Captain Phillips, and Jennifer Lawrence won Best Actress in a Supporting Role for American Hustle.

The ceremony was broadcast on BBC One and BBC Three. It was hosted by Stephen Fry, the ninth time he's hosted the ceremony. The ceremony opened with a duet call "Heroes" from Tinie Tempah and singer Laura Mvula. Viewing figures were the lowest since 2010, with 4.73 million watching the ceremony.

Winners and nominees

BAFTA Fellowship
 Helen Mirren

Outstanding British Contribution to Cinema
 Peter Greenaway

Statistics

In Memoriam

Shirley Temple
Joan Fontaine
Elmore Leonard
Saul Zaentz
Julie Harris
Ray Dolby
Graham Stark
Stephenie McMillan
Philip Seymour Hoffman
Eileen Brennan
Ray Harryhausen
David Campling
Maximilian Schell
Esther Williams
Jean Kent
Gerry Hambling
Ruth Prawer Jhabvala
Vic Hammond
Eleanor Parker
Bryan Forbes
Anwar Brett
Run Run Shaw
Paul Walker
Deanna Durbin
Antonia Bird
Peter O'Toole

See also
 3rd AACTA International Awards
 86th Academy Awards
 39th César Awards
 19th Critics' Choice Awards
 66th Directors Guild of America Awards
 27th European Film Awards
 71st Golden Globe Awards
 34th Golden Raspberry Awards
 28th Goya Awards
 29th Independent Spirit Awards
 19th Lumières Awards
 4th Magritte Awards
 1st Platino Awards
 25th Producers Guild of America Awards
 18th Satellite Awards
 40th Saturn Awards
 20th Screen Actors Guild Awards
 66th Writers Guild of America Awards

References

External links
 67th BAFTA Awards page

Film067
2014 in British cinema
2013 film awards
2014 in London
Royal Opera House
February 2014 events in the United Kingdom
2013 awards in the United Kingdom